Ahmed Labidi (19 April 1923 – 17 July 2008) was a Tunisian long-distance runner. He competed in the marathon at the 1960 Summer Olympics. He had previously represented France in the 10,000 metres at the 1952 Helsinki Olympics.

References

1923 births
2008 deaths
Athletes (track and field) at the 1960 Summer Olympics
Tunisian male long-distance runners
Tunisian male marathon runners
Olympic athletes of Tunisia
People from Sidi Bouzid
Athletes (track and field) at the 1952 Summer Olympics
Olympic athletes of France